Khlong Chandi railway station is a railway station located in Chandi Subdistrict, Chawang District, Nakhon Si Thammarat. This station is the alighting point for Lan Saka District, Chang Klang District, Phipun District and Nakhon Si Thammarat City (for passengers on trains not terminating at Nakhon Si Thammarat), continuing the journey by road transport.

Train services 
 Special Express No. 41/42 Bangkok-Yala-Bangkok
 Express No. 85/86 Bangkok-Nakhon Si Thammarat-Bangkok
 Rapid No. 167/168 Bangkok-Kantang-Bangkok
 Rapid No. 169/170 Bangkok-Yala-Bangkok
 Rapid No. 173/174 Bangkok-Nakhon Si Thammarat-Bangkok
 Local No. 445/446 Chumphon-Hat Yai Junction-Chumphon
 Local No. 447/448 Surat Thani-Sungai Kolok-Surat Thani

References 
 
 

Railway stations in Thailand